Sonia Rehman is a Pakistani actress, host and director. She is known for her roles in dramas Coke Kahani, Aks, Band Khirkyon Kay Peechay and Doraha.

Early life
Sonia was born in 1985 on 29th January in Lahore, Pakistan. She completed her studies from University of Lahore. Later she went to America with her husband and she went to New York Film Academy to study black and white photography, direction.

Career
She made her acting debut in 2002 on PTV. She was noted for her roles in dramas Umrao Jan Ada, Ambulance, Ghar Beetiyan and Mohabbat Karne Walon Ke Naam. She also appeared in dramas Ik Naye Mor Par, Pehchaan and Humsafar. Since then she appeared in dramas Coke Kahani, Doraha, Band Khirkyon Kay Peechay and Aks. In 2019 she appeared in drama Dil Kiya Karay with Yumna Zaidi, Marina Khan and Feroze Khan. She also appeared movies Khuda Kay Liye, Dobara Phir Se and Lala Begum. She also hosts Conversation With Sonia Rehman at Aaj Entertainment.

Personal life
Sonia is married and has two children.

Filmography

Television

Film

Awards and nominations

References

External links
 
 

1985 births
Living people
Pakistani television actresses
21st-century Pakistani actresses
Pakistani film actresses